Frederick John Charles "Buster" Harvey (April 2, 1950 – November 25, 2007) was a Canadian ice hockey player who played 407 games in the National Hockey League for the Detroit Red Wings, Minnesota North Stars, Kansas City Scouts, and Atlanta Flames between 1970 and 1977.

Playing career
A native of Fredericton, New Brunswick, Harvey moved to Ontario as a youth and played junior with the Hamilton Red Wings of the Ontario Hockey Association before being selected by the North Stars in the 1970 NHL Amateur Draft. Making his NHL debut that year, he played four seasons with the North Stars before being traded to Atlanta. Early into his second season with the Flames Harvey was traded to Kansas City, who subsequently traded him to Detroit, where Harvey spent the final part of his career, retiring in 1978 after one season in the minor American Hockey League. In 2007 Harvey died, eight months after being diagnosed with cancer. In his honour the Grant-Harvey Centre in Fredericton is named after him and longtime friend Danny Grant. Originally named after only Grant, he behest that Buster's name be added as well.

In memorial to Buster Harvey, a tournament is held every year in Fredericton, named the Annual Buster Harvey Memorial Peewee AAA hockey tournament. In 2013, Tayah Sommer, a female goaltender for the Peewee AAA Fredericton Caps, was the first female player, in the 6-year history of the tournament, to receive the tournament's "Unsung Hero" award. The award was presented by Mrs. Harvey at the newly opened Grant-Harvey Centre in Fredericton.

Career statistics

Regular season and playoffs

References

External links

1950 births
2007 deaths
Atlanta Flames players
Canadian ice hockey right wingers
Cleveland Barons (1937–1973) players
Detroit Red Wings players
Hamilton Red Wings (OHA) players
Ice hockey people from New Brunswick
Kansas City Blues players
Kansas City Scouts players
Minnesota North Stars draft picks
Minnesota North Stars players
Philadelphia Firebirds (AHL) players
Sportspeople from Fredericton
New Brunswick Sports Hall of Fame inductees